Marlaina Danielle Smith  (born April 1, 1971) is a Canadian politician and former journalist who has been serving as the 19th premier of Alberta since October 11, 2022, and leader of the United Conservative Party (UCP) since October 6, 2022. Smith entered provincial politics in 2009, becoming the leader of the Wildrose Party. She won a seat in the Legislative Assembly of Alberta in 2012, serving as leader of the Opposition until 2014, when she resigned to join the governing Progressive Conservatives (PCs). She was the member of the Legislative Assembly (MLA) for Highwood from 2012 until 2015, and became MLA for Brooks-Medicine Hat on November 8, 2022.

Prior to being elected leader of the Wildrose Party, Smith was the director of provincial affairs for Alberta with the Canadian Federation of Independent Business. She has also worked as a journalist in print, radio and television. During this time she shared opinions on healthcare, including her belief that cancer is preventable up to the fourth stage, that hydroxychloroquine cures COVID, and that patients should seek donations from friends, family, and strangers for treatment. Smith contributed to the growth of the Wildrose Party. The party formed the Official Opposition three years after gaining official party status. Smith lives in High River, a town south of Calgary, where she owns and operates a restaurant with her husband.

On March 31, 2022, Smith announced her intention to run in the United Conservative Party leadership election. Upon Premier Jason Kenney's resignation announcement on May 18, 2022, Smith announced her campaign in the leadership election, which was scheduled for October 6, 2022. Smith's campaign gained national attention, particularly due to her proposals to extend Albertan autonomy. On October 6, 2022, Smith won the UCP leadership election defeating six other candidates as determined by instant-runoff voting. On the sixth and final ballot she was declared the winner taking 53 per cent of the vote, defeating former finance minister Travis Toews.

Early life
Marlaina Danielle Smith was born in Calgary on April 1, 1971, and is the second of five children. Growing up, her family lived in subsidized housing. She is named after the song Marlena by The Four Seasons.

She is also a past member of the Girl Guides of Canada and was featured in a 2013 museum exhibit about prominent Girl Guides at the Red Deer Museum and Art Gallery.

Smith attended the University of Calgary and acquired a Bachelor of Arts degree in English, then returned to study economics. As a student she worked at McDonald's, at a bingo parlour and at restaurants bussing tables.

The university had a strong political scene that crossed the political spectrum while Smith was a student, which included fellow students Ezra Levant and Naheed Nenshi. She was active in the campus Progressive Conservatives and was eventually elected president of the club. She also became involved in political campaigning and met her first husband, Sean McKinsley.

After graduating with an English major, Smith briefly lived in Vancouver where she worked as a waitress and as an extra in movie and TV productions.

Smith returned to the University of Calgary to major in economics. One of her professors was Tom Flanagan, a conservative political activist and advisor, who would become a mentor for Smith. Flanagan in 1996 recommended Smith for a one-year public policy internship with the Fraser Institute and would become her campaign manager during the 2012 Alberta general election.

Early political and media career

Calgary Board of Education
In 1998, Smith entered politics when she ran for the board of trustees of the Calgary Board of Education. She won, but less than a year later, the chairwoman complained that the board had become dysfunctional. In response, the provincial Minister of Learning, Lyle Oberg, dismissed the entire board after 11 months into their term.

Years later, Smith said she had been far too strident during her tenure as a board trustee and said the experience taught her to be more tolerant of those with whom she disagreed. Subsequently, Smith pursued work as an advocate for ranchers, farmers and other rural landowners with the Alberta Property Rights Initiative and the Canadian Property Rights Research Institute.

Smith supported Ted Morton in the 2006 PC leadership election. Morton lost to Ed Stelmach, and Smith became increasingly disillusioned with what she said were Stelmach's "free-spending ways". Smith cited the 2008 provincial budget as a turning point where she determined that Stelmach's government had 'lost its way'.

Career as Calgary Herald columnist and talk radio host 
After her time as a school board trustee Smith joined the Calgary Herald as a columnist with the editorial board. Her columns included coverage of city hall and health reform, but also ventured into provocative topics. In 2003, she wrote a column supporting the legalization of sex work and proposed the creation of a red-light district in Calgary. That same year, she wrote smoking cigarettes can "reduce the risk of disease."

She then went on to succeed Charles Adler as host of the national current affairs program Global Sunday, a Sunday-afternoon interview show on Global Television. She also hosted two talk radio programs focused on health policy and property rights.

She met her second husband, David Moretta, who was an executive producer with Global at the time and would go on to be a former executive producer with Sun Media.

In 2004, Smith was named one of Calgary's "Top 40 Under 40".

In September 2006, she co-hosted the Calgary Congress, a national assembly of citizens and economic and constitutional specialists to consider basic federal reforms for Canada.

Smith was hired by the Canadian Federation of Independent Business in 2006, becoming a provincial director for Alberta.

Career as a lobbyist 
In June 2019, Smith registered as a lobbyist for the Alberta Enterprise Group, an association where Smith was also the president. At that time Smith lobbied the provincial government on behalf of industry for the RStar program.

Provincial politics

Wildrose Party

Smith quit the PC party in 2009 and joined the Wildrose Alliance. The Tories sent MLA Rob Anderson, one of the more fiscally conservative members of their caucus, to talk Smith out of it. Years later, Smith recalled that Anderson told her that despite the Tories' reckless spending and unwillingness to listen to the backbench, they were the only credible centre-right party in the province. Smith refused to stay, saying that there was no hope of restoring Alberta to fiscal sanity under the Tories, and that the Wildrose was the only credible chance at electing a fiscally conservative government. As far as she was concerned, she told Anderson, "This (Tory) government is beyond redemption. It's out of control."

Later that year, Smith was recruited by Wildrose officials to run for the leadership of the party. During the course of the leadership campaign outgoing leader Paul Hinman won in a by-election in the riding of Calgary-Glenmore. His win meant he was one of four in the Wildrose caucus; by the time Smith was elected leader on October 17, 2009, support for the party had quadrupled since the 2008 election. After Smith was elected leader, support for the Wildrose Party continued to grow. Smith convinced three PCs who served in government to cross the floor to join the Wildrose Party: Rob Anderson and Heather Forsyth, and later Guy Boutiller.

In early 2011, she was featured in an episode of CBC Television's Make the Politician Work.

2012 election 
For most of the time before the 2012 provincial election, it appeared that Smith was poised to become the first woman to lead a party to victory in an Alberta election. Numerous polls indicated that the Wildrose Party could defeat the governing Progressive Conservatives, who were also led by a woman, Premier Alison Redford. The PCs had governed the province since 1971, the second-longest unbroken run in government at the provincial level.

The Wildrose Party won 17 seats on 34.3% of the popular vote, and took over Official Opposition status from the Alberta Liberal Party. Smith was elected to the Legislature from Highwood, just south of Calgary, on the same day, defeating John Barlow, editor of the Okotoks Western Wheel.

Political pundits suggested Wildrose lost their early polling lead over the Progressive Conservatives due to Smith's defence of two Wildrose candidates who had made controversial remarks. Allan Hunsperger, running in an Edmonton riding, had written a blog post claiming that gays would end up in a "lake of fire" if they did not renounce their lifestyle. Ron Leech had claimed he would have a leg up on the competition in his Calgary riding because he was white. According to the National Post, Hunsperger and Leech's extreme views, as well as Smith's refusal to condemn them, cost her a chance of unseating Redford. Ultimately, Wildrose was denied victory mainly because it was unable to get any foothold in the urban areas. It won only two seats in Calgary and was completely shut out in Edmonton.

In appraising the election results at the Wildrose 2012 annual general meeting, Smith advocated freezing out candidates who cannot respectfully communicate their views in future elections. Smith asked members to adopt a forward-looking policy platform for the next election.

Rejoining the Progressive Conservative Party

After Redford left politics in the spring of 2014 due to allegations of corruption, Smith's Wildrose party was initially the major beneficiary. However, this momentum stalled when former federal cabinet minister Jim Prentice became PC leader and premier. Under Prentice, the PCs swept four by-elections in October. Smith was dealt a second blow at the Wildrose annual general meeting, when an anti-discrimination resolution that she strongly supported was voted down while she was out of the room.

On December 17, 2014, Smith announced that she, deputy leader Rob Anderson, and seven other Wildrose MLAs were crossing the floor to join the PCs. Smith had criticized two other Wildrose MLAs for defecting to the PCs a month earlier; she had publicly stated that "there'll be no more floor crossings." It was later revealed, however, that Smith and Prentice had been in talks about a possible merger for several months. Smith said that several conversations with Prentice revealed that they shared much common ground, particularly on fiscal issues. Ultimately, she concluded that it made little sense for her to continue in opposition. "If you’re going to be the official Opposition leader," she said, "you have to really want to take down the government and really take down the premier. I don't want to take down this premier. I want this premier to succeed." Several weeks after Smith joined the Progressive Conservatives, in a Facebook post, she apologized for the anger caused by her move and for not consulting with Albertans before making the decision. At the same time, she stood by her decision to "unify conservatives" in the province, and indicated that she intended to seek the Progressive Conservative nomination in Highwood for the next election.

Smith was defeated in her bid for the PC nomination in Highwood by Okotoks Councillor Carrie Fischer on March 28, 2015. Smith's defeat was attributed to her floor-crossing which angered many in her riding. Fischer then lost to Wildrose candidate Wayne Anderson in the general election.

Talk radio
In the intervening period, Smith went on to host a talk radio program on CHQR in Calgary.  On January 11, 2021, she announced that she was leaving her talk show and Twitter, citing attacks from Twitter trolls, effective February 19, 2021.

After she became premier, it was revealed that she made comments on April 29 during a Locals.com livestream about Russia's invasion of Ukraine. Smith argued for a peace plan between Russia and Ukraine and advocated for Ukraine's neutrality. She also made subsequently deleted posts in March that questioned whether breakaway regions in Ukraine should be able to govern independently, and whether NATO played a role in the invasion, citing a conspiracy theory promoted by Tucker Carlson alleging 'secret U.S. funded biolabs' in Ukraine. On October, 16, she issued a statement saying that she "stands with the Ukrainian people" and advocated for diplomacy to "spare millions of Ukrainian lives." Smith also made posts on Locals.com critical of COVID-19 vaccines and questioned the legitimacy of reports that unmarked graves had been found in Canadian residential schools.

In July 2021, Smith wrote an opinion article supporting Jason Kenney's referendum on equalization payments, held on October 18, 2021.

Premier of Alberta

UCP Leadership race 
In May 2022, Smith announced that she was launching a campaign to seek the leadership of the United Conservative Party of Alberta, after the resignation of sitting premier and UCP leader Jason Kenney. Smith was perceived to be the frontrunner among party members in the race to replace Kenney according to internal polling released to the Calgary Sun.

Smith's central policy was to enact what she called the Alberta Sovereignty Act if she became premier. The proposal argued for more autonomy for Alberta in Confederation and called on the provincial legislature to make determinations on when to ignore federal legislation infringing upon Alberta's jurisdiction. Six of Smith's opponents in the leadership race criticized the act. Jason Kenney described it as a "full-frontal attack on the rule of law", as well as a step towards separation and a "banana republic".

On October 6, Smith won the UCP leadership vote with 53.77% of the vote on the sixth ballot, becoming the premier-designate. She was sworn in as the 19th premier and minister of Intergovernmental Relations on October 11.

Smith's campaign ran a deficit of $26,792 after spending $1,389,829 on her successful campaign.

Tenure 
After being sworn in as premier, Smith said that she would not impose any further measures to control the COVID-19 pandemic in Alberta. She also said that people who are unvaccinated should be protected under the Alberta Human Rights Act; alluding to COVID-19 vaccine mandates, she said that they have been "the most discriminated against group that I've ever witnessed in my lifetime", had "faced the most restrictions on their freedoms in the last year", and that "we are not going to create a segregated society on the basis of a medical choice". The remarks faced criticism for alleged trivialization of discrimination faced by minority groups, for which Smith did not apologize.

On October 24, Smith pulled Alberta from the World Economic Forum Global Coalition for Value in Healthcare, saying that she would not "work with a group that talks about controlling governments." "I find it distasteful when billionaires brag about how much control they have over political leaders," she said.

As Smith was not a member of the Legislative Assembly at the time she became premier, she ran in a by-election for the southern Alberta seat of Brooks-Medicine Hat on November 8, 2022. The incumbent, fellow UCP MLA Michaela Frey, resigned soon after Smith was elected leader and premier, and had encouraged Smith to run. Longstanding convention in Westminster systems calls for the incumbent in a safe seat to resign in order to allow a newly elected leader a chance to enter the legislature. Smith won the by-election, with 54.5% of the vote.

In late-November 2022, Smith backpedaled on her plan to introduce a bill that would add unvaccinated individuals as a protected class under the Alberta Human Rights Act. However, Smith continued to promote an intent for herself and her ministers to contact businesses and organizations that were still "discriminating" via COVID-19 vaccine mandates and ask them to "reconsider their vaccination policy in the light of new evidence". She stated that "most employers have made the responsible decision to not discriminate against their workers", and for people to inform their MLAs "If there is still discrimination".

Political views and public image
Smith is libertarian on social issues. She is pro-choice and supports same-sex marriage. While she was a columnist with the Calgary Herald, she argued in favour of legalizing sex work. During her UCP leadership campaign in 2022, Smith said she supported letting transgender athletes compete in preferred gender categories.

A Wildrose insider told Calgary Herald editorial page editor Licia Corbella in 2014 that Smith had grown increasingly uncomfortable with the number of social conservatives supporting the Wildrose Party while she was leader. Smith herself told CBC News that the defeat of the anti-discrimination resolution led her to seriously consider returning to the PCs.

While she was leader of the Wildrose Party, Smith supported conscience rights legislation for health care workers and opposed publicly funding gender-affirming surgeries.

Smith shared a mentor, political scientist Tom Flanagan, with former Reform Party leader Preston Manning and former prime minister Stephen Harper. She has an affinity towards Manning's movement and Harper's government. Smith distanced herself and the Wildrose Party from Flanagan in February 2013, after he made controversial remarks over child pornography.

Smith has been described as media-savvy and adept at presenting a professional and polished image, though she has also been criticized for making false claims about a cure for COVID-19, E. coli and statements blaming stage 4 cancer patients for their diagnosis. She has since apologised for making statements on E. coli.

Controversies about ancestry claims 
Smith has made claims about her ancestry that have been debunked by genealogists and Canadian immigration records.

Her paternal great-grandfather was Philipus Kolodnicki, whose name was anglicized to "Philip Smith" upon arriving in Canada. In a 2012 profile in The Globe and Mail, Smith claimed Kolodnicki was a Ukrainian immigrant who arrived in Canada in 1915. In October 2022, she claimed Kolodnicki left Ukraine after the First World War, which ended in 1918, to escape communism. She said her political beliefs were "largely born out of a complete distrust of the socialism from which my great-grandfather fled." However, immigration records show Kolodnicki arrived in Canada in 1913, before either the First World War or the 1917 October Revolution. Additionally, Kolodnicki listed his nation of origin as Austria and his race as Ruthenian, a term that referred to the ancestors of modern Ukrainians, Belarusians and Rusyns.

Beginning in 2012, Smith claimed she had Cherokee roots through her great-great-grandmother, Mary Frances Crowe. Smith also claimed Crowe was part of the Trail of Tears and forcibly relocated to Kansas in the 1830s. However, an investigation from APTN National News looked over U.S. census records and found Crowe was born in 1870 in Georgia, about 20 years after the U.S. government forced the Cherokee out of their homelands. Kathy Griffin, a Cherokee genealogist in Texas who worked with APTN, could not find proof that any of Smith's ancestors were members of the historical Cherokee tribes, including the Eastern Band of Cherokee Indians, the United Keetoowah Band of Cherokee Indians of Oklahoma, or the Cherokee Nation. Smith's ancestors also did not appear on the Dawes Roll, a U.S. registry cataloguing members of the Cherokee, Creek, Choctaw, Chickasaw and Seminole. A statement to the National Post following APTN's story said Smith had not done a “deep dive into her ancestry” and "heard about her heritage from her loved ones."

Electoral history

References

External links 
 

1971 births
20th-century Canadian politicians
20th-century Canadian women politicians
21st-century Canadian politicians
21st-century Canadian women politicians
Alberta school board trustees
Canadian columnists
Canadian libertarians
Canadian people of Ukrainian descent
Canadian television news anchors
Canadian women television journalists
Conservatism in Canada
Female Canadian political party leaders
Living people
Politicians from Calgary
Progressive Conservative Association of Alberta MLAs
University of Calgary alumni
Wildrose Party MLAs
Canadian women columnists
Women MLAs in Alberta
United Conservative Party MLAs
Leaders of the United Conservative Party
Premiers of Alberta